is a Japanese monthly anime magazine by IID. First published on June 9, 1981.

Overview 
Animedia was first published on June 9, 1981 by Gakken Holdings (currently IID). The magazine provides news and information on the anime industry, including cast and staff listings, broadcast schedules, and exclusive features and interviews. Along with "Animage" and "Newtype", it is one of the top three anime magazines and one of the top 10 selling anime magazines in Japan.

Acquisition 
IID, the media company that runs the Anime! Anime! and Anime! Anime! Biz news websites, has announced its acquisition of Animedia and its sister magazine Seiyū Animedia from Gakken Plus publisher. IID also acquired the other irregularly published "mooks" (magazine books) and the Chō! Animedia website from Gakken Plus.

Annual awards 

Anime Character Awards:

This is held every year in the February issue. The ranking of characters that fit various criteria, such as "cool" or "dumb," as determined by readers' votes, is announced among characters from anime works broadcast in the past year. For many years, it was included at the top of the magazine, but it was not included in the February 2011 and 2012 issues.

Top 10 Most Popular TV Anime:

This project was done every year from 1984 to 2008 in the February issue's "10 Greatest Anime News" (sometimes not in some years), but in 2009 it was published in the January issue's supplementary notebook along with "Major News".

Readers' Choice for the Best Anime of All Time:

This is an annual poll of the best anime works and characters of all time, held in the July issue (the anniversary issue). For many years it was included at the top of the magazine, but for the July issues of 2010, 2013, and 2014, it was not. In addition to male and female characters, there used to be a category for other characters (anything but humans).

References

External links 

 Animedia (Official website)

1981 establishments in Japan
Anime magazines published in Japan
Magazines established in 1981